Aggie Soccer Field, also known as Aggie Field, is a 1,000 seat soccer stadium on the campus of the University of California, Davis, adjacent to Davis, California.

Aggie Soccer Field was the result of volunteer efforts dating back to the mid-1980s, the same as the Dobbins Baseball Complex which is the home to UC Davis Aggies baseball.

References

External links
 UC Davis athletic facilities

University of California, Davis campus
College soccer venues in California
Soccer venues in California
Sports venues in Yolo County, California
UC Davis Aggies